Promontorium Deville is a mountainous cape situated on the northeast margin of Mare Imbrium on the near side of the Moon.  Its selenographic coordinates are 43.31° N, 1.14° E.  It is located north of Promontorium Agassiz, south of Mont Blanc, northeast of Mons Piton, and northwest of Cassini crater.

Promontorium Deville is named after Charles Joseph Sainte-Claire Deville, a French meteorologist and geologist.  The name of the feature was approved by the IAU in 1935.

External links
 LAC-25, a map showing Promontorium Deville and surrounding area

References 

Mountains on the Moon